Surjit Singh Rakhra is an Indian politician who belongs to the  Shiromani Akali Dal. He was Minister for Water Supply and Sanitation, Higher Education and Languages (2012–2017) in the Punjab Government. In 2019 Parliament Elections, he lost the election to Preneet Kaur of the Indian National Congress.

Family
His father is Kartar Singh Dhaliwal and his mother is Jaswant Kaur. His brothers Darshan Singh Dhaliwal and Charanjit Singh Dhaliwal are businessmen in the United States.

Political career
He was elected to the Punjab Legislative Assembly in 2002 on an Akali Dal ticket from Samana. He was re-elected from Samana in 2012. He has served as Minister for water supply and sanitation, higher education and languages in the Punjab government led by Parkash Singh Badal. However, he lost the Parliamentary elections from Patiala in 2019.

Controversy
Rakhra generated considerable controversy when he declared that the alleged killing of a young girl by a bus driver operated by the Badal family that controls the Punjab government was an accident and "God's will".

References

Place of birth missing (living people)
Year of birth missing (living people)
Indian Sikhs
Shiromani Akali Dal politicians
Punjab, India MLAs 2002–2007
Punjab, India MLAs 2012–2017
People from Patiala
Living people
State cabinet ministers of Punjab, India
Punjabi people